The Guatemalan Embassy is the diplomatic representative of the Guatemala Government to the United States Government. Its main functions are to protect the interests of the State and its citizens; keep the channels of communication between governments, encourage and promote trade relations and track identified topics of interest by both countries.

It is located at 2220 R Street NW, Washington, DC. The current ambassador is Alfonso Quiñónez.

History
Following its independence from Spain in 1821, Guatemala joined the Federation of Central American States in 1823 along
with Honduras, Nicaragua, Costa Rica, and El Salvador. The United States recognized the Federation of Central America and the diplomatic relations with Guatemala were established when President James Monroe received Antonio José Cañaz as Envoy Extraordinary and Minister Plenipotentiary on August 4, 1824.

The American Legation in Guatemala was established on May 3, 1826, when the Chargé d'Affaires John Williams presented his credentials to the Federation of Central American States.

On May 4, 1943, the Guatemalan Legation in the United States was raised to Embassy with Adrian Recinos as Envoy Extraordinary and Minister Plenipotentiary.

Independent Guatemala was recognized on April 5, 1844, by the issuance of an exequatur to a Guatemalan Consul-General Antonío de Aycinena. Diplomatic relations with independent Guatemala were established in 1849 when Chargé d'Affaires Elijah Hise presented his credentials to the Republic of Guatemala on or shortly before January 21, 1849.

After Jacobo Arbenz government was overthrown, on July 12, 1954, Secretary of State John Foster Dulles instructed the U.S. Embassy at Guatemala City to establish diplomatic relations with the new Guatemalan government. The following day, Ambassador John E. Peurifoy informed Foreign Minister Salazar of the U.S. recognition of the new government in Guatemala.

Former ambassadors
Diplomatic representation of Guatemala in the U.S.

Abbreviations:
 [Amb.] E.E. and M.P.= Envoy Extraordinary and Minister Plenipotentiary
 [Chargé d'Affaires] a.i.= ad interim
 Amb. E. & P. = Ambassador Extraordinary and Plenipotentiary

Bilateral relationship
Guatemala has a good diplomatic, political, economic, and trade relationship with the United States. The United States remains one of the major trading partners of Guatemala, there are strong political and cooperation ties between the two countries.

The bilateral relationship with the United States on security can be defined as the high priority by the importance of the developed joint actions, especially the cooperation for regional security and the improvement of public organizations, among others.

The relationship is maintained and performed at the highest level with officials from the United States Department of State, the Department of Homeland Security, US Southern Command, the United States Senate and the Ministry of Narcotics Affairs.

Guatemala maintains relationships with the Department of Homeland Security with the US Immigration and Customs Enforcement (ICE) and the Customs and Border Protection (CBP) in conjunction with the National Secretariat for Property Management in Forfeiture.

This relationship has brought support to several institutions in Guatemala combating organized crime. Among the main activities are: funding for Police Reform programs, High Trust Units (vetted Units), the anti-gang program (PANDA) and CICIG Model and police stations. In addition, support in the modernization of research processes and the reform of institutionalization in the Public Ministry, the process of extradition, modernizing and strengthening the implementation of justice, the prison system,
training programs and maritime capabilities, and prevention and detection of criminal activity at the border.

The main concerns in the Guatemala-United States bilateral relationships are: Regional Security Initiative for Central America (CARSI), National Police and Public Ministry, adoptions, International Commission against impunity in Guatemala (CICIG),
Human Rights, institutionalization of project FIAAT and TPS (Temporary Protected Status).

Guatemalan consulates in the United States
Guatemala has established thirteen consulates general in the United States. Each consulate has its jurisdiction, which covers different areas of the country.

See also
Guatemala–United States relations
Guatemalan Americans
Foreign relations of the United States
Foreign relations of Guatemala

References

External links
Embassy of Guatemala in the United States - www.guatemalaembassyusa.org
U.S. Department of State Office of the Historian - http://history.state.gov/countries/guatemala
The Statesman's Year Book - http://www.statesmansyearbook.com/
wikimapia
http://dc.about.com/od/photos/ig/Embassy-Pictures-/Guatemala.htm

Guatemala
Washington, D.C.
Guatemala–United States relations
 
Guatemala
United States